Northern Monmouthshire was a parliamentary constituency in Monmouthshire.  It returned one Member of Parliament (MP) to the House of Commons of the Parliament of the United Kingdom.

History

The constituency was created by the Redistribution of Seats Act 1885 for the 1885 general election. It was abolished for the 1918 general election.

Boundaries 
 The constituency comprised the Petty Sessional Divisions of:
Abergavenny (The civil parishes of Abergavenny, Abergavenny Rural, Bwlch-Trewyn, Cwmyoy Upper, Cwmyoy Lower, Llanellen, Llanfoist, Llangattock, Llingoed, Llangattock-nigh-Usk, Llanover Lower, Llansaintffraed, Llanthewy-Rytherch, Llanthewy-Skirrid, Llantillio-Pertholey, Llanvapley, Llanvetherine, Llanvihangel-Crucorney, Llanvihangel-nigh-Usk, Llanwenarth Citra, Llanwenarth Ultra and Oldcastle)
Pontypool (Abersychan, Blaenavon, Glascoed, Goytre, Llanvair Kilgedin, Llanhilleth, Llanvihangel-Pontymoile, Llanfrechfa (Upper), Mamhilad, Panteg, Pontypool and Trevethin)
and Skenfrith (Grosmont, Llangattock Vibon Avel, Llangua, Llantilio Crossenny, Llanvihangel-Ystern-Llewern and St Maughans, Skenfrith)

On abolition by the Representation of the People Act 1918, the area of the constituency was included in the Monmouth and Pontypool constituencies.

Members of Parliament

Election results

Elections in the 1880s

Elections in the 1890s

Elections in the 1900s

Elections in the 1910s 

General Election 1914–15:

Another General Election was required to take place before the end of 1915. The political parties had been making preparations for an election to take place and by the July 1914, the following candidates had been selected; 
Liberal: Reginald McKenna
Unionist: David Ellis Williams
Labour: James Winstone

References

Sources 

History of Monmouthshire
Historic parliamentary constituencies in South Wales
Constituencies of the Parliament of the United Kingdom established in 1885
Constituencies of the Parliament of the United Kingdom disestablished in 1918
Politics of Monmouthshire